Alek is a given name and alternative form of Alec. Notable people with the name include:

 Alek Bédard (born 1996), Canadian curler
 Alek D. Epstein (born 1975), Russian-Israeli sociologist of culture and politics
 Alek Dzhabrailov (1976-2009), Chechen human rights activist
 Alek Keshishian (born 1964), Armenian-American film and commercial director, writer, and producer
 Alek Manoah (born 1998), American baseball pitcher
 Alek Manolov (born 1986), Bulgarian footballer
 Alek Minassian (born 1992), Canadian murder suspect
 Alek Osmanović (born 1982), Croatian bobsledder
 Alek Popov, Bulgarian novelist, writer, essayist and scriptwriter
 Alek Rapoport (1933-1997), Russian Nonconformist artist, art theorist and teacher
 Alek Sandar (born 1987), Bulgarian music producer, songwriter and recording artist
 Alek Skarlatos (born 1992), American actor and US Army National Guard soldier
 Alek Stojanov (born 1973), Canadian ice hockey player
 Alek Thomas (born 2000), American MLB player
 Alek Torgersen (born 1995), American football quarterback
 Alek Wek (born 1977), South Sudanese-British model and designer

See also
Alec, given name